Lieutenant General Arthur Nugent Floyer-Acland,  (7 September 1885 – 18 February 1980) was a senior officer of the British Army who served in both the First and Second World Wars. He was Military Secretary from 1940 to 1942. In later life, he was High Sheriff and Deputy Lieutenant of Dorset.

Early life
Born Arthur Acland on 7 September 1885, he was the second son of John Edward Acland and his wife Norah Letitia, daughter of Henry Nugent Bankes. He was educated in Blundell's School, located in Tiverton, Devon. In 1928, he assumed by Royal Licence the additional surname Floyer to inherit the estates of George Floyer.

Military career
Floyer-Acland entered the British Army in 1905 and was commissioned as a second lieutenant into the 5th Battalion of the Royal Warwickshire Regiment. In February 1907, he was transferred to the Duke of Cornwall's Light Infantry. He fought in the First World War, receiving the Military Cross in 1915. He was promoted to a brevet-major in 1917, mentioned in despatches seven times during the course of the war, and was awarded the Distinguished Service Order in 1918 and the French Croix de Guerre in 1920.

Floyer-Acland attended the Staff College, Camberley in 1921 and was breveted to lieutenant colonel in 1927. Four years later, he received the command of the 1st Battalion of his regiment and in 1934 became colonel, being then attached to the War Office. After two years he came in charge of the 3rd Infantry Brigade and took part in the Waziristan campaign until 1938. He was promoted major general later that year, and became General Officer Commanding (GOC) of the 43rd (Wessex) Infantry Division, a Territorial Army formation, until February 1940.

In 1940, Floyer-Acland was appointed Military Secretary. In the King's Birthday Honours that July he was appointed a Companion of the Order of the Bath. He was advanced to a lieutenant general in 1941, and retired from his post in the next year. Floyer-Acland was nominated High Sheriff of Dorset in 1953 and served as Deputy Lieutenant of that county from 1957.

Family
On 6 December 1913, Floyer-Acland married Evelyn Stafford Still, daughter of Stafford Still. His wife died in 1973 and Floyer-Acland survived her until 1980. Their only son was Stafford Floyer-Acland.

References

Bibliography

External links

Generals of World War II

|-

1885 births
1980 deaths
British Army lieutenant generals
Military personnel from Dorset
British Army generals of World War II
British Army personnel of World War I
Companions of the Distinguished Service Order
Companions of the Order of the Bath
Deputy Lieutenants of Dorset
Duke of Cornwall's Light Infantry officers
Graduates of the Staff College, Camberley
High Sheriffs of Dorset
People educated at Blundell's School
Recipients of the Croix de Guerre 1914–1918 (France)
Recipients of the Military Cross
Royal Warwickshire Fusiliers officers
War Office personnel in World War II